The Coastal States Organization (CSO) is a U.S. non-profit organization located in Washington, D.C., that represents the Governors of the nation's thirty-five coastal states, commonwealths and territories. CSO represents the Governors on legislative and policy issues relating to the sound management of coastal, Great Lakes and ocean resources. It contributes to the development of coastal zone management legislation and programs.

History
At the 1969 National Governor's Association Conference, a committee on national marine affairs introduced the resolution to create CSO which was endorsed unanimously., The resolution noted the growing public interest and concern in maintaining the quality of the environment, and that state and territorial governments had not been adequately represented in the emerging national coastal programs. The resolution further emphasized that state governments could best increase their ability to contribute to development and operation of the National Oceanographic and Coastal Zone Management Programs by forming an organization designed to achieve these purposes. The organization thus came into being in 1970.

Membership and organization

The Organization's membership consists of the thirty-five coastal states, commonwealths and territories, which are represented by delegates appointed by the Governors. Including senior state officials from the state environmental, natural resource, or planning agencies, these delegates constitute CSO's Governing Board.

Priorities
Organizational priorities for 2012–2014 are: Coastal Zone Management, Climate Change Adaptation, Coastal Land Acquisition, National/Regional Ocean and Coastal Governance, Corals, and Funding.

Organizational priorities in 2008–2009 were: Climate change, Coastal Zone Management Act Reauthorization, Energy/Outer Continental Shelf (OCS) activities and appropriations.

References

External links
 Coastal States Organization

Non-profit organizations based in Washington, D.C.
Environmental organizations based in Washington, D.C.